Francis Watson "Frank" Shaw (born 13 May 1864) was a Scottish footballer who played as a winger.

Career
Born in Glasgow, Shaw played club football for Pollokshields Athletic and Queen's Park, and made two appearances for Scotland in 1884. He retired from football in 1885 to sail to India.

References

1864 births
Year of death missing
Scottish footballers
Scotland international footballers
Pollokshields Athletic F.C. players
Queen's Park F.C. players
Association football wingers
Place of death missing